Royal Air Force Luqa was a Royal Air Force station located on the island of Malta, now developed into the Malta International Airport.

It hosted aircraft of Air Headquarters Malta (AHQ Malta) during the Second World War. Particularly during the Siege of Malta from 1941 to 1943, RAF Luqa was a very important base for British Commonwealth forces fighting against Italy and Germany for naval control of the Mediterranean and for ground control of North Africa.  Air combat over and near Malta was some of the most ferocious of the war, and a series of airfields were built on the small, rocky island: at Luqa, Ta' Qali, and Hal Far, plus satellite fields at Safi, Qrendi and on Malta's second island of Gozo.

History

Second World War
No. 1435 (Night Fighter) Flight was first formed at Malta as a night fighter unit on 4 December 1941, by re-designating the Malta Night Fighter Unit. In July 1942, personnel from No. 603 Squadron were equipped with the Spitfire V to form the unit. After a brief period as No. 1435 (Fighter) Flight, at Luqa, due to its size it was raised to No. 1435 Squadron RAF on 2 August 1942 still at Luqa.

RAFWeb writes that the original Malta "photographic reconnaissance unit was No. 69 Squadron RAF." "B" Flight, No. 69 Squadron RAF was formed into No. 683 Squadron RAF on 8 February 1943. No. 683 Squadron flew Supermarine Spitfire Mark IVs, Mark XIs and later Mark XIXs. Just over eight months later, in November 1943, No. 683 Squadron moved to Tunisia.

Post war

After the war, Luqa remained an important RAF base, serving during the Suez Crisis of 1956, but also served as Malta's main civilian airport. No. 37 Squadron RAF, which had arrived from Palestine in 1948, left Luqa for RAF Khormaksar in Aden in July 1957. While four Avro Shackleton aircraft and the squadron's identity were transferred to Aden, two aircraft were left to join No. 38 Squadron RAF, still at Luqa. No. 13 Squadron RAF began a long association, equipped with English Electric Canberra, moving to Malta in 1965 and remained in Malta until transferring to RAF Wyton in 1978.

No. 203 Squadron RAF disbanded on 31 December 1977 at Luqa, by which time it was part of No. 18 Group within RAF Strike Command. It had been flying BAe Nimrod maritime patrol aircraft.

The RAF left in 1979 following a British government decision not to renew the lease on the station from the Maltese. The payments demanded were several times the previous payments under the previous lease. A No. 120 Squadron RAF Nimrod made the last flight out of Luqa on the morning of 1 April 1979.

Current use

Nowadays, the location has been developed into the main entry point of the modern, independent country of Malta, under the name Malta International Airport. It is sometimes still referred to as "Luqa Airport" or "Valletta Airport".

See also
List of former Royal Air Force stations
List of air stations of the Royal Navy

References

External links

RAF Luqa Remembered

Airports in Malta
Military installations of Malta
Luqa
Luq
World War II sites in Malta
Luqa
Military installations closed in 1979
Malta–United Kingdom military relations